is a Japanese electronic music producer. He is known for his single, "Do It Again," which is often mistaken to be Soichi Terada's work as a result of an incorrect credit on YouTube. Yokota has been described as "one of Japan's unsung heroes of house."

Biography

Early life and career 
Yokota comes from the Ōta ward, growing up in Tokyo and its adjacent suburbs of Kanagawa and Chiba, and attended Chidori Elementary School in south Tokyo during the early 80's, where he played baseball. Yokota liked other activities, such as football and swimming, but also liked playing his father's electric organ. Yokota started listening to Yellow Magic Orchestra in elementary school, and quit baseball to take piano lessons across the street from his house. He studied for two years before using his pocket money to buy a Casio MT-40 in Akihabara. After a couple of years, he bought a Korg Poly-800 and a cassette recorder. When computers started popping up when he was in middle school, he started recording tracks around 1982. In 1983, after YMO broke up, Yokota discovered hip hop through a midnight radio program, which led him to stop using synthesizers and make his own beats. He became a supporting member of Puzzle Jam Rockers and was involved in the production of early hip-hop albums such as Krush Posse and East End while doing track making and turntablism.

Introduction to house music 
In 1987, Yokota met fellow producer Soichi Terada when participating in a Vestax DJ Contest, where Yokota won a prize. Terada introduced him to house music and synthesizers, even letting him in his house to watch him perform and have Yokota use his gear during his free time. He began making house music, but said that it was difficult to find others like him since the dominant style of electronic music in Tokyo was Hi-NRG and eurobeat.

He formed the label Far East Recording with Terada in 1990. He and Terada would put out their first album called Far East Recording in 1992.

Absence from music 
Yokota has stated that he lost his motivation to create music due to the influx of new technology. He stated, “In the past, sampling time was limited so you had to be really creative when you had an idea. But with hard disk recording the possibilities were endless, and around 2000 I lost my motivation to make music.” He focused more on his custom car parts company, Night-Pager, that he launched in 1992. Also during this time, he raised his three children. In 1999, Yokota and Terada played at Club Citta for a memorial event for Roger Troutman, playing "Computer Love." The event would be their last live before going on hiatus. In 2011, another company he created that sold camera parts went bankrupt, but managed to restart his company as a producer of custom-made car parts.

Resurgence 

In early 2013, a YouTube channel called UtopiaSpb uploaded a rip of "Do It Again," but incorrectly credited the song to Terada. While their other rips range from 1 thousand views to 9.8 thousand views, "Do It Again" garnered more than 2 million views as of June 2020. Multiple users, including Terada himself, pointed out the inaccuracy, but the channel has been inactive since the upload of the song.

In May 2016, he appeared in Boiler Room playing a live set. In November of that same year, he released his second album, Do It Again And Again, which includes unreleased songs produced in the late 80's and early 90's.

In September 2019, he released his third album, I Know You Like It, and in October, released Ultimate Yokota 1991-2019.

In March 2020, he participated in the music festival Snow Machine alongside Terada, Chida, Kuniyuki Takahashi, FEMM, Mayurashka, Gonno and Kikiorix.

Albums

Do It Again and Again 
Do It Again and Again was released on November 30, 2016. The album had a release party at Circus Tokyo on February 25. The album is Yokota's first full-length solo album, with Stefan Betke mastering the album. Yokota described it as "a compilation of my whole life producing" so that he could "relive 27 years of significant memories."

I Know You Like It 
I Know You Like It was released on September 25, 2019, three years after Do It Again and Again. The album includes covers of Yokota's previous songs "Night Drive" and "Shake Yours" and a cover of the song "Simoon" by Yellow Magic Orchestra.

The album received generally positive reviews. The Tape Deck rated it a yellow, saying that his "melange of thin high-frequency synths and rhythm fills, comes through clearly on I Know You Like It, a cheekily-titled release that will hopefully see him find a greater American audience." Yellow means that it had high points in aesthetics and originality, but low points in intellect. This also means that it "stands out in both emotional evocation and in uniqueness." At Finding Figaro, the author explains, "It’s an incredibly consistent album cover-to-cover and, to my ears, already feels like a timeless classic, definitely one of the releases of 2019."

Ultimate Yokota 1991-2019 

Ultimate Yokota 1991-2019 was released in October 2019. All songs included in the album were previously unavailable in vinyl form. Yokota said about the compilation: "This project ‘Ultimate Yokota’ is a careful selection of tracks from the early 90’s which haven’t been released on vinyl ever. It is my 30 years chronicle." The album includes six songs from Do It Again and Again and six songs from I Know You Like It.

Chal Ravens of Resident Advisor said, "His ear for melody and a snappy sample provides endless variety, but the basic recipe tends to combine the bossy, velvet-lined grooves of classic New York house with a certain Japanese accent—playful earworms and plasticky organs straight from an arcade game, or notes of laidback electro-boogie that make you want to start your engine and cruise through the neon-lit bustle of south Tokyo."

Artistry

Influences 

Yokota has said that Haruomi Hosono of the Yellow Magic Orchestra is one of his major influences, stating the he listened to YMO and Ryuichi Sakamoto when he was 10 years old. From 1985 to 1995, he listened to hip hop artists from Sugar Hill Records, Def Jam Recordings and Tommy Boy Records, and "was hugely impressed by the stuff Lil Louis was doing."

Musical style 
Yokota's music focuses on electronic and house music, including downtempo, deep house, and tech house. His style is similar to collaborator Soichi Terada, as well as Galaxy 2 Galaxy, Ata Kak, Los Microwaves, and Larry Heard. Yokota prefers a  simpler style of music where "it’s basically made up of beats and bass from the rhythm machine and vocals on top."

Discography

Singles and EPs 
1991: "Twin Base Vol. 1" (with Soichi Terada)
1991: "Tokyo XXX" (with Terada) [BPM]
1991: "Got To Be Real" (with Terada) [Far East]
1991: "Let's Groove" (with Terada) [Far East]
2014: "The Far East Transcripts" (with Terada) [Hhatri]
2015: 'The Far East Transcripts II" (with Terada) [Hhatri]
2016: "The Far East Transcripts III" (with Terada) [Hhatri]
2018: "Tokyo Horoki Part 1' (with Pleasure Cruiser & Smoke Thief) [High Hoops]
2020: "Detectors" [Far East]
????:  "Believe The House / Purpul Haze" [Far East]

Studio albums 
1992: Far East Recording (with Terada) [Far East]
2016: Do It Again And Again [Far East]
2019: I Know You Like It [Far East]

Compilations 
2019: Sound Of Vast - 5 Years Anniversary Series 02 (with The Mole) [Sound Of Vast]
2019: Ultimate Yokota 1991-2019 [Sound Of Vast]

Appearances 
2015: Soichi Terada - Sounds from the Far East [Rush Hour]

References

External links 
 Official Facebook and personal Facebook
 Shinichiro Yokota on SoundCloud

Living people
Japanese electronic musicians
20th-century Japanese musicians
1969 births
Musicians from Tokyo
Japanese house musicians
21st-century Japanese musicians